I'll Always Know What You Did Last Summer is a 2006 American direct-to-video slasher film. The film is the third installment of I Know What You Did Last Summer franchise, but does not have any of the cast returning from the first two installments, thus making it a standalone sequel to I Still Know What You Did Last Summer. The film instead takes the basic myth of the series with a new set of characters.

Released on August 15, 2006, it is the first film in the series to use supernatural elements other than a slasher formula.

Plot
On July 4, 2005, in the fictional town of Broken Ridge, Colorado, Amber Williams, her boyfriend Colby Patterson and their friends Zoe, Roger, and PJ stage a prank at the town carnival where Roger impersonates the "Fisherman" killer. Afterward, everyone sees PJ's body impaled on a tractor smokestack instead of mattresses that were supposed to break his fall. The public believes the Fisherman is behind it, and the friends burn the evidence and make a pact to keep it secret.

One year later in 2006, Amber returns to town to discover that Colby never left to pursue his scholarship. She goes up to the mountains where she encounters one of the officers who witnessed the accident, Deputy Haffner. Later that night, Amber awakens to 50 text messages reading "I know what you did last summer." She drives to Zoe's shack where Zoe allows Amber to sleep for the night. The next day they find Roger and Colby, but they angrily dismiss them when told about the messages. Amber is attacked on a ski-lift by someone wielding the hook.

A drunken Roger contemplates suicide with the hook from the prank. When he investigates a noise, he is attacked and killed by the Fisherman. Colby is also attacked while swimming. They go to warn Roger and find him dead along with a suicide note and the hook. Deputy Haffner shows up and gets their statements. Afterward, they return to Amber's house to find pictures of them from the high school yearbook sliced up and stuck to the wall reading "SOON". They all stay at Zoe's place and find Lance, PJ's cousin, outside. He shows them a message engraved on his motorbike.

The night of Zoe's concert, after her performance, she, Amber, and Lance are attacked by the Fisherman. Zoe is stabbed and thrown over a balcony to her death. P.J's dad, the sheriff, comes in, only to be killed as well. The Fisherman then attacks Colby in a kitchen and hooks him in the mouth, killing him. Outside, Amber and Lance run into Deputy Haffner, who reveals that Roger told him about the accident. The Fisherman then advances towards Haffner and impales him on a forklift.

Amber and Lance get into a car and run the fisherman down. He gets up and is revealed to be the undead Ben Willis, the man who committed the original murders 8 years ago. Willis attacks them but is cut with a hook by Amber and disappears. Amber and Lance go to face Willis, deducing that the hook will hurt him. They are chased into a warehouse. Amber then fights Willis and eventually stabs him in the head, and pushes him into a snow blower driven by Lance, killing Willis.

A year later in 2007, Amber is driving across the desert when a tire blows out. She stops the car and loses reception. Willis appears behind her and the screen cuts to black as Amber's scream is cut off by the slicing sound of the hook, ending the film, leaving the viewers questioning that Willis has killed her.

Cast

Production
Director Sylvain White was brought in as a last-minute replacement after the previous director was fired, and thus had to cast the film, prep the locations, and devise the shooting schedule within just two weeks. White did not use any CGI in the film, as he felt that gore looks much more realistic with practical effects than with CGI.

Music
A soundtrack of the film was never released.
"LFL" – performed by Goth Jones
"Colosseum" – performed by The Bedbugs
"U Owe It 2 U" – performed by Weapon of Choice
"I Want You" – performed by FFF
"Body Rot" – performed by Goth Jones
"Something I Haven't Thought Of...In Years" – performed by Mazey Gordens & The Brick Hit House Band
"Business in the Front/Party in the Back" – performed by Mazey Gordens & The Brick Hit House Band
"FFT" – performed by Goth Jones
"One of Those Nights" – performed by Junior
"Step to the Floor" – performed by Illegal Substance
"Daredevil" – performed by Weapons of Pleasure
"Between You and Me" – performed by Suffrajett
"NY" – performed by Suffrajett

Reception

Critical response
The film received highly negative reviews from critics, criticising the plot, acting, editing and lack of originality. Scott Weinberg of DVD Talk called it "a 12th-generation knock-off that leeches off a flaccid little concept that was already withered and whiskered the first and second time around". He described the directing, editing, script, and acting all as predictable and uninteresting, ultimately summarizing the film as "not so much outrageously awful as it is deadly dry and dishwater dull". The film has a rare 0% rating on Rotten Tomatoes based on five reviews, the minimum number for a score, with an average score of 2.6/10.

References

External links
 
 

2006 films
2006 direct-to-video films
2006 horror films
2000s American films
2000s English-language films
2000s slasher films
2000s teen horror films
2000s supernatural horror films
American sequel films
American supernatural horror films
American teen horror films
Destination Films films
Direct-to-video horror films
Direct-to-video sequel films
Films based on urban legends
Films directed by Sylvain White
Films produced by Neal H. Moritz
Films scored by Justin Burnett
Films set in 2005
Films set in 2006
Films set in 2007
Films set in Colorado
Films shot in Utah
Holiday horror films
3
Independence Day (United States) films
Mandalay Pictures films
Original Film films
Sony Pictures direct-to-video films
Supernatural slasher films